Nicholas Geiger Bitsko (born June 16, 2002) is an American professional baseball pitcher in the Tampa Bay Rays organization. He was selected 24th overall by the Rays in the 2020 Major League Baseball draft.

Amateur career
Bitsko attended Central Bucks High School East in Buckingham, Pennsylvania. He committed to play college baseball at the University of Virginia in November 2016.

Bitsko gained notoriety due to the circumstances of his draft stock rising; due to the coronavirus pandemic, few Major League Baseball scouts had seen him pitch, and much of the data collected was collected virtually. He was a top-rated prospect for the 2021 Major League Baseball draft according to Baseball America, but graduated from high school early and reclassified to the class of 2020. In 2020, he was named Pennsylvania's Gatorade Player of the Year.

Professional career
Bitsko was selected 24th overall by the Tampa Bay Rays in the 2020 Major League Baseball draft. He signed with the Rays for a $3 million bonus.

In December 2020, Bitsko underwent right shoulder surgery. He did not make an appearance in 2021 while recovering.

References

External links

Baseball players from Pennsylvania
Living people
2002 births
Florida Complex League Rays players